Chung Ling (Chinese: 鍾玲; born 1945) is a Taiwan-Chinese writer.

Chung Ling may also refer to:

 Chung Ling High School
 Chung Ling Butterworth High School
 Nadia Chan Chung Ling, a Hong Kong-based actress

See also
 Zhong Ling (disambiguation)